Library Voices are a Canadian indie pop band from Regina, Saskatchewan. Formed in 2008 as a ten-piece group of musician friends, they have released two EPs and three full-length albums. The current band members include Paul Gutheil, Ethan Anderson, Michael Dawson, Carl Johnson, Brennan Ross, Amanda Scandrett and Mike Thievin.

The band features such instruments as horns, strings, and an accordion.

Reception 
The band was noticed by The New Yorker and by Spin.  The alternative newsweekly Now, in a favourable review of the band's EP Hunting Ghosts (& Other Collected Shorts), described the track "Step Off the Map & Float" as "the EP's clear standout, one of the year’s catchiest and cutest indie rock singles." Vue Weekly wrote, "there's a curious pop-anthem flavouring to Hunting Ghosts that makes the sound gel more than you might expect." The Calgary Herald'''s critic wrote of the band's album, prior to its release, "Even in its current rough, unfinished form, it's obvious Library Voices have come up with one of 2009's finest records of the year."

Their EP was nominated for Independent Album of the Year at the 2009 Western Canadian Music Awards, and their album Denim on Denim was nominated for the same award in 2010. Their second full-length album, 2011's Summer of Lust, was preceded by the lead single "The Prime Minister's Daughter", which responded to Prime Minister Stephen Harper's controversial assertion that "ordinary people don't care about the arts" by imagining a future scenario in which his daughter Rachel falls in love with a musician.

 Discography 
Albums
 2008: Hunting Ghosts (& Other Collected Shorts) (EP)
 2010: Denim on Denim 2011: Summer of Lust (August 2011)
 2014: For John (EP)
 2015: Lovish''

Singles

References

External links 
 Library Voices on Myspace
 Library Voices at CBC Radio 3

Canadian indie pop groups
Musical groups from Regina, Saskatchewan
Musical groups established in 2008
2008 establishments in Saskatchewan